Chrysomela is a genus of leaf beetles. Chrysomela can also refer to:
 Chrysomela, an 1877 volume of poems by Robert Herrick
 Chrysomela, a newsletter about leaf beetles